Fangio: Una vita a 300 all'ora (English: Fangio: A life at 300 [ kilometres ] an hour) is a 1981 documentary film about Formula One champion Juan Manuel Fangio. It was directed by Hugh Hudson and stars Fangio as himself. It was written by Gualtiero Jacopetti. It was filmed at Titanus studios.

The movie poster depicts Fangio driving a Maserati F1 car, most likely a 250F.

Other personnel
Riz Ortolani- music
John Alcott- cinematography
Peter Taylor- film editor
Ivor Powell- production manager
Tony Jackson- sound department

References

External links
 

Italian auto racing films
Documentary films about sportspeople
Documentary films about auto racing
1981 documentary films
1981 films
Films directed by Hugh Hudson
Formula One mass media
1980s Italian films